The French Agrarian and Peasant Party (PAPF) was a French political party founded in 1927 during the French Third Republic. The PAPF was founded on a corporatist, right-wing populist and agrarian program. However, the PAPF divided into a left-wing and right-wing, with the party's "left" founding the Republican, Social and Agrarian Party led by the PAPF's sole deputy in 1932, Louis Guillon (Vosges). The right-wing, which remained known as the PAPF, was led by Pierre Mathé (Côte-d'Or).

Post-war, a small Peasant Party briefly existed before joining the National Centre of Independents and Peasants (CNI), which exists to this day (though much weaker than in the past).

See also 
Liberalism and radicalism in France
Sinistrisme

Defunct political parties in France
Political parties of the French Third Republic
Right-wing parties in France
Defunct agrarian political parties
Political parties established in 1927
1927 establishments in France